Daniel Reiner (born 17 January 1941 in Moissac) was a member of the Senate of France, representing the Meurthe-et-Moselle department. He is a member of the Socialist Party.

References
Page on the Senate website

1941 births
Living people
French Senators of the Fifth Republic
Socialist Party (France) politicians
Senators of Meurthe-et-Moselle
Officiers of the Légion d'honneur
People from Tarn-et-Garonne